"T.O.N.Y." is a song by American singer Solange Knowles. It was written and produced by Jack Splash and Cee-Lo Green for her second studio album Sol-Angel and the Hadley St. Dreams (2008) and released on March 31, 2009 as the album's third and final single (see 2009 in music). The word "T.O.N.Y." is used as a shortening of "The Other Night Y?", referring to a one-night stand. The music video features Kid Cudi, Cee-Lo Green and Solange's son Daniel Julez Smith, Jr.

Music video
The music video was directed by Va$htie and Solange Knowles. It features cameo appearances by Kid Cudi who plays "T.O.N.Y. (The Other Night oh Y?)" and Cee-Lo Green.
The video sees Solange running around frantically, seemingly because of T.O.N.Y; At the end of the video she holds a positive pregnancy test and a paper reading "The Other Night Y???" (T.O.N.Y). The video then switches to "T.O.N.Y" (Kid Cudi) holding the same pregnancy test and sheet of paper. The video switches back to Solange, and her holding a picture of her and a little boy, which is her son, and writing on the picture "I'm in love now".

Track listing
Australian Remixes
"T.O.N.Y." (DJ Escape Mix) - 7:11
"T.O.N.Y." (Mark Pichiotti Mix) - 7:18
"T.O.N.Y." (Lost Daze In My Room Mix) - 8:16
"T.O.N.Y." (Lost Daze Extended) - 4:33
"T.O.N.Y." (Zoned Out Club Mix) - 4:59
"T.O.N.Y." (Zoned Out Hard Electro Mix) - 7:02
"T.O.N.Y." (Dan McKie Mix) - 6:19

Charts

Weekly charts

Year-end charts

Release history

References

External links
 SolangeMusic.com — official site

2008 songs
2009 singles
Solange Knowles songs
Music videos directed by Vashtie Kola
Songs written by CeeLo Green
Songs written by Jack Splash
Geffen Records singles